Gladden Spit and Silk Cayes Marine Reserve (GSSCMR) is a protected marine reserve in the central part of Belize's Barrier Reef. Established in 2003, The reserve comes under the authority of the government's Fisheries Department, but is managed by the Southern Environmental Association, a community-based organisation.

Gladden Spit is a promontory forming the southernmost tip of the sunken atoll. The spit has a short sloping shelf that drops off steeply at about 40–2000 metres in depth within  of the reef.

Three small cayes: North Silk, Middle Silk and South Silk, lie south of Gladden entrance just inside Queen Caye. A nesting colony of terns has been recorded on North Silk Caye.

The reserve contains some of the healthiest parts of the reef system due to its elevation and good water quality. Gladden Spit itself hosts over 25 species of reef fish. Since the 1920s, fishermen have congregated here to harvest mutton snapper and grouper during their ten-day spawning aggregation period that occurs between March and June. Historically, fishermen recorded substantial catches, and whale sharks—who come to feed on the eggs—were sighted in large numbers. It is the only place worldwide where this activity is known to occur.

The reserve was declared on 18
May 2000 (Gazette No. 68/2000). In 2001, the feeding site of the whale sharks was declared a special protected zone. Tourism regulations were drafted to regulate the increasing number of whale shark tours. Since 2003, the reserve has been divided into a general use zone, a no-take zone around the Silk Cayes, a conch restoration zone and a whale shark and reef-fish spawning aggregation conservation zone.

References

Nature conservation in Belize
Marine reserves
Protected areas of Belize
Protected areas established in 2000
Mesoamerican Barrier Reef System